Watanga Football Club is a Liberian association football club founded on December 24, 1997.  The club was named after the military camp established just outside Monrovia by former members of the rebel movement at the end of the First Liberian Civil War in 1996. The club won the national championship in 2022 and was a finalist for the 2012 LFA Cup.

Honours
 Liberian First Division
 Champions (1): 2021–2022

Recent seasons

Current squad

Technical Staff
Cooper Sannah - Head Coach = 
Pettanie Mulbah - Deputy Coach = 
Joshua G. Kporyour - Assistant Coach = 
Sonnyboy Mason - Kit Manager|nat = 
Daniel D. Wright - Team Doctor = 
Robert Y. Garswah - Administrative Manager =

Famous players

Managers
  Cooper Sannah

References

External links
 [ Official site]
 Watanga FC on facebook
 SOCCERWAY
 SOFASCORE
 FLASHSCORE
 Globalsportsarchive

Association football clubs established in 1997
Football clubs in Liberia